Fernando Luis Duarte Mungi (10 April 1941 – 3 September 2017) was a Peruvian basketball player. He competed in the men's tournament at the 1964 Summer Olympics. Duarte's brothers, Enrique, Raúl, and Ricardo were also professional basketball players. All four of them were during the 1964 Olympics.

References

External links
 

1941 births
2017 deaths
Peruvian men's basketball players
Olympic basketball players of Peru
Basketball players at the 1964 Summer Olympics
People from Piura
20th-century Peruvian people